The 1987 NAIA Division II football season, as part of the 1987 college football season in the United States and the 32nd season of college football sponsored by the National Association of Intercollegiate Athletics (NAIA), was the 18th season of play of the NAIA's lower division for football.

The season was played from August to November 1987 and culminated in the 1987 NAIA Division II Football National Championship, played at the Tacoma Dome near the campus of Pacific Lutheran University in Tacoma, Washington. Pacific Lutheran and Wisconsin–Stevens Point played to a tie, 16–16, and were declared co-national champions. It was Pacific Lutheran's second NAIA national title and Wisconsin–Stevens Point's first. However, the Pointers later forfeited their shared of title after it was discovered they had been used two ineligible players during the season.

Conference realignment

Conference changes
 This was the first season for the Mid-South Conference.

Conference standings

Conference champions

Postseason
{{16TeamBracket

| RD1         = First RoundCampus sites
| RD2         = QuarterfinalsCampus sites
| RD3         = SemifinalsCampus sites
| RD4         = ChampionshipTacoma, WA

| team-width  = 170

| RD1-seed01  =  
| RD1-team01  = 
| RD1-score01 = 24
| RD1-seed02  =  
| RD1-team02  =  ‡
| RD1-score02 = 17

| RD1-seed03  =  
| RD1-team03  = 
| RD1-score03 =13
| RD1-seed04  =  
| RD1-team04  = *
| RD1-score04 =16

| RD1-seed05  = 
| RD1-team05  = 
| RD1-score05 =24
| RD1-seed06  = 
| RD1-team06  = Wisconsin–Stevens Point*
| RD1-score06 =50

| RD1-seed07  = 
| RD1-team07  = 
| RD1-score07 = 21
| RD1-seed08  = 
| RD1-team08  = *
| RD1-score08 = 3

| RD1-seed09  = 
| RD1-team09  = 
| RD1-score09 =26
| RD1-seed10  = 
| RD1-team10  = *
| RD1-score10 =38

| RD1-seed11  = 
| RD1-team11  =  
| RD1-score11 =35
| RD1-seed12  = 
| RD1-team12  =  ‡‡
| RD1-score12 =37

| RD1-seed13  = 
| RD1-team13  = 
| RD1-score13 =21
| RD1-seed14  = 
| RD1-team14  = * (OT)
| RD1-score14 =28

| RD1-seed15  = 
| RD1-team15  = 
| RD1-score15 =21
| RD1-seed16  = 
| RD1-team16  = Pacific Lutheran*
| RD1-score16 = 40

| RD2-seed01  = 
| RD2-team01  = Westminster (PA)*
| RD2-score01 = 15
| RD2-seed02  = 
| RD2-team02  = Geneva
| RD2-score02 = 16

| RD2-seed03  = 
| RD2-team03  = Wisconsin–Stevens Point
| RD2-score03 = 30
| RD2-seed04  = 
| RD2-team04  = Saint Ambrose*
| RD2-score04 = 14

| RD2-seed05  = 
| RD2-team05  = Tarleton State*
| RD2-score05 = 12
| RD2-seed06  = 
| RD2-team06  = Baker
| RD2-score06 = 13

| RD2-seed07  = 
| RD2-team07  = Carroll (MT)*
| RD2-score07 = 26
| RD2-seed08  = 
| RD2-team08  = Pacific Lutheran
| RD2-score08 = 36

| RD3-seed01  = 
| RD3-team01  = Geneva 
| RD3-score01 = 25
| RD3-seed02  = 
| RD3-team02  = Wisconsin–Stevens Point*
| RD3-score02 = 48

| RD3-seed03  = 
| RD3-team03  = Baker
| RD3-score03 = 14
| RD3-seed04  = 
| RD3-team04  = Pacific Lutheran* (OT)
| RD3-score04 = 17

| RD4-seed01  = 
| RD4-team01  = Wisconsin–Stevens Point
| RD4-score01 = 16| RD4-seed02  = 
| RD4-team02  = Pacific Lutheran*
| RD4-score02 = 16}}

 ‡ Game played at Lexington, Kentucky ‡‡ Game played at Lawrence, Kansas''

See also
 1987 NCAA Division I-A football season
 1987 NCAA Division I-AA football season
 1987 NCAA Division II football season
 1987 NCAA Division III football season

References

 
NAIA Football National Championship